Sverkmoen is a farming area in the municipality of Namsos in Trøndelag county, Norway. It is west of the village of Namdalseid, between the lake Øyungen and the river Sverka which flows through a flat landscape covered with forests.

References

Villages in Trøndelag
Namsos